The 2015 Nigerian Senate election in Sokoto State was held on March 28, 2015, to elect members of the Nigerian Senate to represent Sokoto State. Abdullahi Ibrahim Gobir representing Sokoto East, Aliyu Magatakarda Wamakko representing Sokoto North and Ibrahim Abdullahi Danbaba representing Sokoto South all won on the platform of All Progressives Congress.

Overview

Summary

Results

Sokoto East 
All Progressives Congress candidate Abdullahi Ibrahim Gobir won the election, defeating People's Democratic Party candidate Dahiru Yari and other party candidates.

Sokoto North 
All Progressives Congress candidate Aliyu Magatakarda Wamakko won the election, defeating People's Democratic Party candidate Ahmed Muhammad Maccido and other party candidates.

Sokoto South 
All Progressives Congress candidate Ibrahim Abdullahi Danbaba won the election, defeating People's Democratic Party candidate Abdullahi Muhammad and other party candidates.

References 

Sokoto State Senate elections
March 2015 events in Nigeria
Sok